The Anglo-Celt is a weekly local newspaper published every Thursday in Swellan, Cavan, Ireland, founded in 1846. It exclusively contains local news about Cavan and surroundings. The news coverage of the paper is mainly based on the paper's local county of Cavan. Over the years it has fended off competition from papers like the Cavan Post and The Cavan Voice. It is owned by Celtic Media Group.

According to the Audit Bureau of Circulations, it had an average weekly circulation of 18,000 during the first six months of 2007.

The newspaper has its offices in the former Cavan railway station.

References

External links

1846 establishments in Ireland
Mass media in County Cavan
Newspapers published in the Republic of Ireland
Publications established in 1846
Weekly newspapers published in Ireland